Simhavarman I (IAST: Siṃha Varmā) was the earliest recorded Pallava king. His only inscription was found at Manchikallu Village in Palnadu district of Andhra Pradesh.

References

Pallava kings